Cypress is a common name for multiple coniferous trees and shrubs in the family Cupressaceae.

Cypress may also refer to:

Places

United States
 Cypress, California, a city
 Cypress, Florida, an unincorporated community
 Cypress, Illinois, a village
 Cypress, Indiana, an unincorporated community
 Cypress, Texas, an unincorporated community
 Cypress Island, Washington
 Cypress Creek (Logan Creek), Missouri
 Cypress Creek (Texas)

Canada
 Cypress Provincial Park, greater Vancouver, British Columbia
 Cypress (former Alberta provincial electoral district)
 Cypress (former Manitoba provincial electoral district)
 Cypress (former Saskatchewan provincial electoral district)

Music
Cypress Hill
Cypresses, an 1865 cycle of 18 songs by Dvořák
Cypresses quartet (Dvořák), a set of 12 string-quartet arrangements by Dvořák based on his song-cycle of the same name
Cypress, a 1984 album by the rock music group Let's Active
Cypress Records, a record label
 Cypress, a 2022 extended play by Sarah Kinsley

Companies
 Cypress Group, a US private equity firm
 Cypress Semiconductor, a semiconductor manufacturing company based in San Jose, California

Schools
 Cypress College, a community college in Cypress, California
 Cypress High School, Cypress, California
 Cypress Christian School, near Cypress, Texas
 Cypress Bay High School, in Weston, Florida

Other uses
 Cypress Mine, a coal mine on the South Island of New Zealand
 , a United States Coast Guard cutter
 Tawny Cypress (born 1976), American actress
 Cypress, codename of the ATI Radeon HD5800 series of graphics processing units
 Cypress Street Viaduct a raised two-deck freeway in Oakland, California that collapsed during the 1989 Loma Prieta earthquake.
 Cypress is a JavaScript end-to-end testing framework
 The Cypress (Brookline High School), the Brookline High School student newspaper

See also
 Cypress Hills (disambiguation)
 Cypress Lake (disambiguation)
 Cypres, cybernetic parachute release system
 Cypris (disambiguation)
 Cyprus (disambiguation)